Presidential elections were held in Djibouti on 8 April 2016. Incumbent President Ismaïl Omar Guelleh was re-elected for a fourth term, receiving 87% of the vote in the first round.

Electoral system
The President of Djibouti was elected using the two-round system. After a modification of the constitution in 2010, six year terms were shortened to five year terms and term limits were abolished.

Candidates
Guelleh, president since 1999, ran for his fourth term in office and was considered likely to win against his six opponents. The Union for the Presidential Majority believed that Guelleh would win a landslide victory and prevent a second round run-off.

The Union for National Salvation (USN), a coalition of seven opposition parties, claimed the election lacked transparency. Three of the seven parties decided to boycott the elections, whilst two others fielded their own candidates, with Mohamed Daoud Chehem and Omar Elmi Khaireh running against each other.

Three independent candidates also ran: Djama Abdourahman Djama, Mohamed Moussa Ali and Hassan Idriss Ahmed.

Conduct 
A team of BBC journalists who had conducted an interview with the Djibouti Foreign Minister and an opposition candidate were detained by the police. The journalists claimed they had proper paperwork to work in the country but were deported after being questioned for eight hours. The BBC has yet to obtain an official statement from the government of Djibouti. Djibouti ranks 170 out of 180 in the Press Freedom Index.

Results

References

Djibouti
President
Presidential elections in Djibouti
Djibouti